Rafael Juan Campo y Pomar (24 October 1813 – 1 March 1890) was President of El Salvador 12 February 1856 – 1 February 1858.

Biography 
Campo was born in Sonsonate, El Salvador. His parents were Pedro Campo Arpa and Juana Maria Pomar, his father being born in Torrijo del Campo (Teruel), Spain on 26 June 1772.  The genealogy, plus photographs and documents of ex-president Campo's family can be seen in the book "Salvadoran Roots" by Jaime Cader, published in 2011.  Photos included are those showing the military rank ("Teniente Coronel") and the Cantabria, Spain origin of the deceased father-in-law of Campo, Juan Antonio del Pomar.  Also included is information concerning the rank and name of the father of Campo's mother-in-law, "Teniente Coronel" Antonio Contreras.

Career 
Rafael Campo was the first cousin of the Marquis de Campo in Valencia, Spain.  (See the article in Spanish in wikipedia.org about José Campo Pérez to read the references.) Campo was elected president on 30 January 1856. He turned over power to his vice president, Francisco Dueñas, on 12 May of the same year, but resumed the presidency on 19 July. He was a member of the Conservative Party.

Campo stepped down after the serious cholera epidemic of 1857 had exhausted the country.  He was in office during Central America's "National War" against William Walker and his filibusters, a very difficult time for that region.  The book "Apuntes Biogáficos del Honorable Ex-presidente de El Salvador -Don Rafael Campo" by Abraham Rivera (1985 edition) has a photograph of Campo with the caption saying that he is the enemy of foreign intervention in Central America.

Death 
He died, aged 76, in Puerto de Acajutla on 1 March 1890.

References

Presidents of El Salvador
1813 births
1890 deaths
People from Sonsonate Department
Salvadoran people of Spanish descent